Marisora brachypoda is a species of skink found in Mexico and Central America.

References

Marisora
Reptiles described in 1956
Taxa named by Edward Harrison Taylor